Puiatu may refer to several places in Estonia:

Puiatu, Lääne County, village in Ridala Parish, Lääne County
Puiatu, Imavere Parish, village in Imavere Parish, Järva County
Puiatu, Paide Parish, village in Paide Parish, Järva County
Puiatu, Jõgeva County, village in Põltsamaa Parish, Jõgeva County
Puiatu, Viljandi County, village in Pärsti Parish, Viljandi County